= Cowpen Creek =

Stream in Georgia, United States

Coordinates: 33°10′55″N 82°44′44″W

Cowpen Creek is a stream in the U.S. state of Georgia.

A variant name was "Jones Cowpen Creek".
